Maciej Bydliński (born March 11, 1988 in Szczyrk, Poland) is an alpine skier from Poland. He competed for Poland at the 2014 Winter Olympics in the alpine skiing events.

References

1988 births
Living people
Olympic alpine skiers of Poland
Alpine skiers at the 2014 Winter Olympics
Polish male alpine skiers
People from Bielsko County
21st-century Polish people